Mahmudabad-e Hoseyn Safar (also Romanized as Maḩmūdābād-e Ḩoseyn Şafar; also known as Mahmood Abad, Maḩmūdābād, and Maḩmūdābād-e Ḩoseyn) is a village in Sharifabad Rural District, in the Central District of Sirjan County, Kerman Province, Iran. At the 2006 census, its population was 20, in 5 families.

References 

Populated places in Sirjan County